Midhirst is a small village in Taranaki, New Zealand, approximately 4 km north of Stratford, on State Highway 3. Inglewood is 17 km (11 mi) north of Midhirst, and New Plymouth is 35 km (22 mi) to the northwest.

Demographics
It is part of the larger Pembroke statistical area.

Midhirst had a population of 252 at the 2018 New Zealand census, an increase of 18 people (7.7%) since the 2013 census, and an increase of 24 people (10.5%) since the 2006 census. There were 99 households, comprising 126 males and 126 females, giving a sex ratio of 1.0 males per female, with 48 people (19.0%) aged under 15 years, 45 (17.9%) aged 15 to 29, 120 (47.6%) aged 30 to 64, and 39 (15.5%) aged 65 or older.

Ethnicities were 92.9% European/Pākehā, 14.3% Māori, 2.4% Pacific peoples, 1.2% Asian, and 3.6% other ethnicities. People may identify with more than one ethnicity.

Although some people chose not to answer the census's question about religious affiliation, 56.0% had no religion, 32.1% were Christian and 1.2% had other religions.

Of those at least 15 years old, 15 (7.4%) people had a bachelor's or higher degree, and 69 (33.8%) people had no formal qualifications. 9 people (4.4%) earned over $70,000 compared to 17.2% nationally. The employment status of those at least 15 was that 105 (51.5%) people were employed full-time, 30 (14.7%) were part-time, and 9 (4.4%) were unemployed.

Education
Midhirst School is a coeducational full primary (years 1-8) school with a roll of  students as of  The school was founded in 1880.

Notes

External links
 Midhirst School website

Further reading

General historical works

Business history

Maps

NOTE: Scale = 1:35,000 and 1:275,000

NOTE: Scale = 1:35,000 and 1:275,000

Schools
 

Populated places in Taranaki
Stratford District, New Zealand